Annie Oakley (1860–1926) was a sharpshooter in Buffalo Bill's Wild West Show.

Annie Oakley may also refer to:

Annie Oakley (1894 film), a short film
Annie Oakley (1935 film), starring Barbara Stanwyck
Annie Oakley (TV series) (1954–1957)
SS Annie Oakley, a Liberty ship in World War II

See also
Ann Oakley (born 1944), British sociologist, feminist, and writer